Louis-Antoine Gaultier (1898–1970) was a général of the French Army who served mainly in the French Foreign Legion.

Military career

World War I 

Louis-Antoine prepared the admission entrance of École spéciale militaire de Saint-Cyr when he was mobilized in 1917. Assigned to the 4th Zouaves Regiment, he was promoted to caporal (corporal) then sergent (sergeant) and aspirant at the end of the war.

Nominated as a sous-lieutenant on 1 February 1919 at the 1st Foreign Regiment 1er RE, he remained in the Legion almost his entire career.

Interwar period 

Nominated as a sous-lieutenant on 1 February 1919 at the 1st Foreign Regiment 1er RE, he remained in the Legion almost his entire career.

He served in Algeria and then Morocco with the 4th Foreign Infantry Regiment 4e REI.  Gaultier was promoted to captain on 25 March 1932.

In May 1939, he left Morocco and the legion for a posting with the 91st Line Infantry Regiment.

World War II 

As of February 1940, he found the legion back again by receiving the commandment of a battalion of the 11th Foreign Infantry Regiment 11e REI during the combats from May to June 1940.

Promoted to the rank of chef de bataillon (commandant – major) on 11 June 1940, he managed to escape after the capitulation of his army corps and made way to join the Zone libre.

He joined the 2nd Foreign Infantry Regiment 2e REI at the beginning of 1941 in Morocco. In 1943, he was assigned to the 3rd Foreign Regiment 3e RE, he joined, with his unit, the Marching Regiment of the Foreign Legion RMLE. Chief of the general staff headquarters of the regiment, he was promoted to lieutenant-colonel on 25 December 1943. With the death of regimental commander of the RMLE, he received the provisionary command of the regiment, from December 1944 to March 1945, prior to command being delegated to colonel Jean Olié.

On 25 June 1945 he was promoted to the rank of colonel at the 21 Line Infantry Regiment.

After-war 

In December 1945, he assumed command of the Communal Depot of the Foreign Regiments at Sidi Bel Abbès. It was under his command and his impulsion that Képi Blanc, the monthly of the French Foreign Legion.

In 1949, the DCRE became the 1st Foreign Infantry Regiment 1er REI. 

He left indefinitely the Legion on 2 June 1950, at the end of his commandment time.

He was accordingly nominated as assistant général Commandant of the subdivision of Montpellier, before taking his retirement as général on 1 July 1955.

Retirement 

On 17 September 1966 he was elected as president of the French Foreign Legion Veteran Societies Federation (Légion étrangère) (FSALE).

In December 1969, he left the presidency of the association and died in March of the following year in Toulon.

Recognitions and honors 

  Commandeur de la Légion d'honneur
  Croix de guerre 1914–1918
  Croix de guerre 1939–1945
  Croix de guerre des TOE
 commandeur de l'ordre du Ouissam alaouite
 commandeur de l'ordre du Nichan Iftikhar

He received a total of 11 citations.

He wrote notably:
 C'est la Légion, Impression française, Marseille, 1972 (with Colonel Jacquot)
 Acte de foi dans la Légion étrangère

See also 
Moroccan Division
Jean Olié
Pierre Segrétain
Pierre Jeanpierre
Jean-Claude Coullon

References

Sources 
Division Histoire et patrimoine de la Légion étrangère
Képi Blanc

1898 births
1970 deaths
French military personnel